Grove Township is one of eleven townships in Jasper County, Illinois, USA.  As of the 2010 census, its population was 618 and it contained 254 housing units.

Geography

Unincorporated towns
 Gila at 
 Island Grove at 
(This list is based on USGS data and may include former settlements.)

Adjacent townships
 Woodbury Township, Cumberland County (north)
 Greenup Township, Cumberland County (northeast)
 Crooked Creek Township (east)
 Wade Township (southeast)
 North Muddy Township (south)
 Bishop Township, Effingham County (southwest)
 St. Francis Township, Effingham County (west)
 Spring Point Township, Cumberland County (northwest)

Cemeteries
The township contains these seven cemeteries: Brewer, Diel, Fairfield, Hicks, Island Creek, Myer and St Joseph/Island Grove.

Airports and landing strips
 Isley Airport

Demographics

School districts
 Dieterich Community Unit School District 30
 Jasper County Community Unit School District 1

Political districts
 Illinois' 19th congressional district
 State House District 108
 State Senate District 54

References
 
 United States Census Bureau 2007 TIGER/Line Shapefiles
 United States National Atlas

External links
 City-Data.com
 Illinois State Archives

Townships in Jasper County, Illinois
1859 establishments in Illinois
Populated places established in 1859
Townships in Illinois